Hurry Up Sundown may refer to:

"Hurry Up Sundown", a song by Bruce Springsteen from his 2014 EP American Beauty
"Hurry Up Sundown", a song by The Balloon Farm